The women's 100 metres event at the 1970 Summer Universiade was held at the Stadio Comunale in Turin on 2 and 3 September 1970.

Medalists

Results

Heats
Held on 2 September

Wind:Heat 1: +2.3 m/s

Semifinals
Held on 3 September

Final
Held on 3 September

References

Athletics at the 1970 Summer Universiade
1970